Barnham may refer to:

People
Alice Barnham (1592-1650), the wife Francis Bacon
Benedict Barnham (c.1559-1598), an English merchant
Stephen Barnham (died 1608), MP for Chichester, West Sussex

Places
Barnham, Suffolk, a village and civil parish in Suffolk, England
Barnham, West Sussex, a village and civil parish in West Sussex, England
Barnham Broom, a village and civil parish in Norfolk, England

Other uses
Barnham railway station, a railway station serving Barnham, West Sussex
Barnham railway station (Suffolk), a former railway station serving Barnham, Suffolk
RAF Barnham, a chemical and nuclear weapons store near Barnham, Suffolk

See also
Barnum (disambiguation)
Branham (disambiguation)